Sergeant Powell may refer to:

People
 Sergeant-Major Powell (16th century), a participant in the Battle of Santo Domingo (1586)
 Alvy Powell (born 1955), U.S. Army Chorus master sergeant and musician
 Felix Powell (1878–1942), Welsh musician and British Army staff sergeant
 Lee Powell (actor) (1908–1944), WWII U.S. Marine Corps sergeant, and film actor
 Ray Powell (police officer), British police sergeant of the South Yorkshire Police Service

Fictional characters
 Al Powell, a fictional police desk sergeant from the 1988 U.S. action film Die Hard
 Detective Sergeant Powell, a fictional character from the 1984 British slasher film Don't Open till Christmas
 Sergeant Powell, a fictional character from the 2014 U.S. horror-comedy film Asylum (2014 film)

See also

 
 
 Powell (disambiguation)
 Sergeant (disambiguation)